Blu elettrico is a 1988 Italian comedy film directed by  Elfriede Gaeng. It stars  Claudia Cardinale and William Berger.

References

External links

1988 films
1980s Italian-language films
Italian comedy films
1988 comedy films
1980s Italian films